Tarom Rural District is a rural district (dehestan) in the Central District of Hajjiabad County, Hormozgan Province, Iran. At the 2006 census, its population was 10,834, in 2,634 families. The rural district has 30 villages.

References 

Rural Districts of Hormozgan Province
Hajjiabad County